Born Reckless is a 1937 gangster film directed by Malcolm St. Clair and Gustav Machatý (St. Clair received sole directorial credit) and starring Brian Donlevy and Rochelle Hudson. Donlevy plays a race-car champion who infiltrates a mob-run taxi cab company. Barton MacLane plays the chief mobster.

Plot

Bob Kane (Brian Donlevy), a former auto racer, becomes a cab driver for a company that is being strong-armed by Jim Barnes (Barton MacLane) and his gangsters trying to gain control of all of the city's taxi companies.
Having gone through all of his winnings from his auto racing career, Kane hitches a train to the East Coast and joins a cab company owned by a former auto racing acquaintance after demonstrating he still has the skills necessary to handle a vehicle. Soon afterwards, Kane ruffles the feathers of Barnes racketeering outfit by banging up the cabs of his stooges. Then Kane is offered a job by Barnes for almost ten times the money to get him off their backs. He is introduced to an armored cab Barnes intends to use to terrorize the few remaining holdout cab companies into his protection scheme. Kane declines the offer, but not before using Barnes' own war wagon to smash up his garage. Barnes girlfriend, Sybil, then tries to persuade Kane to reconsider the offer, but gets upstaged when an inept Barnes driver using the armored car to harass a fellow driver known to Kane botches the job and the other driver ends up dying from the hit and run gone wrong. Kane resolves to put Barnes behind bars for the crime, but gets stymied when Barnes puts the armored car into hiding. Barnes has his girlfriend then try to convince Kane to leave town with a payoff to prevent more violence. Instead, with a little perjury to get the District Attorney off Barnes back, Kane takes him up on his offer to drive for him in order to bring the armored cab back out of hiding. Some machinations ensue and Kane nearly traps Barnes with a sting operation involving law enforcement, but Barnes escapes at the last minute. In retribution, Barnes plots to destroy the rival cab garage that holds the owners staff and law enforcement officers by running a gasoline tanker truck down a hill and straight into the business. Barnes also finally discovers Sybil and Kane are actually operating in cahoots against him and in an eventual reversal of fortune ends up being held at gunpoint by Sybil while police close in and Kane acquires the armored cab and runs down the tanker truck in the nick of time. Barnes ends up being shot and killed by the responding officers, and Kane goes to the hospital to recover from his injuries received in his rescue crash. Kane gets the girl and everybody lives happily ever after.

Cast
 Rochelle Hudson as Sybil Roberts
 Brian Donlevy as Bob 'Hurry' Kane
 Barton MacLane as Jim Barnes
 Robert Kent as Lee Martin
 Harry Carey as Dad Martin
 Pauline Moore as Dorothy Collins
 Chick Chandler as Windy Bowman
 William Pawley as Mac
 Francis McDonald as Louie
 George Walcott as Danny Horton (as George Wolcott)
 Joseph Crehan as District Attorney

Production
Filming occurred at the Fox studio and at Union Station in downtown Los Angeles. During filming, Donlevy injured his hand, necessitating that two fingers be bandaged. The bandaged hand had to be concealed throughout filming, though it is visible at the end of the film. Former stars of the silent era Jack Mulhall, Joyce Compton and Mary MacLaren have uncredited bit parts.

Union Station did not open until 1939.

References

External links
 
 
 
 

1937 films
1937 crime drama films
American crime drama films
American black-and-white films
Films directed by Malcolm St. Clair
20th Century Fox films
Films scored by Samuel Kaylin
1930s American films